Virgin Land may refer to:
"Virgin Land", a short story in the Doctor Who anthology Short Trips: Zodiac
Virgin Lands Campaign, a Russian initiative
Virgin Land: The American West as Symbol and Myth, an influential 1950 book by American studies researcher Henry Nash Smith
 Virgin Land (album), a 1974 album by jazz drummer and percussionist Airto Moreira
Virgin land or frontier, areas near or beyond a boundary